Morrisville is an unincorporated community in southern Fauquier County, Virginia, on U.S. Route 17, and the southern terminus of State Route 806, at an elevation of 436 feet (133 m).

Notable people
Richard Leroy Williams, United States District Court judge

References

Unincorporated communities in Fauquier County, Virginia
Unincorporated communities in Virginia